Lone Ranch Beach is a beach administered by the Oregon Parks and Recreation Department, as it is part of the Samuel H. Boardman State Scenic Corridor.

The beach is located near Brookings, Oregon, along the U.S. Route 101.

See also
 List of Oregon state parks

References

External links
 

State parks of Oregon
Parks in Curry County, Oregon
Beaches of Oregon
Landforms of Curry County, Oregon